Kajetan Kraszewski (11 March 1827, Pruzhany district - 1 July 1896, Pruzhany district) was the younger brother of Józef Ignacy Kraszewski. He is the author of numerous novels and plays, as well as a history of the Kraszewski family.

Biography 
In addition to Józef, he had another older brother, Lucjan, who was an artist and photographer. His primary education took place at the gymnasium in Svislach.

in 1854, he married Maria Rulikowska. Upon his father's death, in 1864, he inherited the family's estate in Romanów; reconstrycting the manor house, which had been heavily damaged by a fire. He also created an astronomical observatory, with equipment imported from Munich, Berlin, Vienna and Paris, introduced modern farming methods, and built a greenhouse where he grew pineapples. He and Maria had five children; two of whom were deaf mutes.
  
He left a library of over 10,000 volumes, as well as collections of old prints and manuscripts, historical portraits, and various objects, including weapons. His son, Krzysztof, donated the books to the Jagiellonian Library in Kraków. Most of the other items were destroyed during World War II.

He wrote historical novels, plays, poetry, sketches and memoirs. All but a few of his works are set in what is now Belarus. He also published detailed records of the Kraszewski family and their estates. He was an amateur composer as well; creating music for piano based on local folk motifs.

Most notable works
 Ze wspomnien kasztelanica (From the Castellan's Memoirs), 1896 (Online)
 Monografia domu Kraszewskich vel Kraszowskich Jastrzebczyków (Monograph of the house of Kraszewski), 1862 (Online)

References

External links

1827 births
1896 deaths
People from Pruzhany District
People from Pruzhansky Uyezd
Polish male writers
